Pierre Schoeman (born 7 May 1994 in Nelspruit, South Africa) is a South African rugby union player. He plays for Edinburgh Rugby in the United Rugby Championship and for Scotland internationally. His regular position is loosehead prop.

Rugby Union career

Youth career

He played for them at the Under-16 Grant Khomo Week in 2010 and at the 2011 and 2012 Under-18 Craven Week tournaments.

Schoeman then represented the  side in the 2012 and 2013 Under-19 Provincial Championships.

Professional career

Schoeman made his first class debut during the 2014 Vodacom Cup competition. He started in the ' 24–26 defeat to eventual champions .

In April 2018, it was announced that Schoeman would join Scottish Pro14 club Edinburgh prior to the 2018–19 Pro14 on a three-year contract. In December 2019, Pierre won the Outstanding Man of the Match performance with rivals Glasgow Warriors in the second leg of the prestigious 1872 Cup, this brought the score to one victory each leaving it all to play for in May 2020.

International career

His performances in the Craven Week competition in South Africa led to his inclusion in the South African Schools side in 2011, playing one match against France. He was once again selected in the South African Schools side in 2012. He played in (and captained) the side in their matches against France and Wales and played off the bench in their match against England.

In 2014, he was selected in the South Africa Under-20 side for the 2014 IRB Junior World Championship in New Zealand. He was the first points scorer for his side at the tournament, getting an 18th-minute try to help the side to a victory over Scotland.

In October 2021 he was named as part of the Scotland training squad for the Autumn nations series, having qualified to play for Scotland through residency. He was subsequently selected for the 42 player full squad for the series. He was selected to start versus Tonga in the match scheduled for 29 October 2021.

He made his Scotland debut against Tonga on 30 October 2021. Scotland won the match 60 - 14, with Schoeman scoring a try.

He played in all five games during the 2022 Six Nations Championship, scoring a try in the final match against Ireland.

References

External links
 

1994 births
Living people
Scottish rugby union players
Scotland international rugby union players
South African rugby union players
People from Mbombela
Rugby union props
Blue Bulls players
South Africa Under-20 international rugby union players
Bulls (rugby union) players
Edinburgh Rugby players
Rugby union players from Mpumalanga
Naturalised citizens of the United Kingdom
South African expatriate rugby union players
Expatriate rugby union players in Scotland
South African expatriate sportspeople in Scotland